Mcbess (Matthieu Bessudo; born July 5, 1984), is a French illustrator living in London.
His style is a mix of influences such as Fleischer Studios' old cartoons he updates by using contemporary shapes, symbols, and types.
Mcbess's drawings often present himself at the center of a surrealist world filled with food and musical references, such as amps, guitars and records.  Mcbess is also a musician in the bands "The Dead Pirates,” and “Mcbaise.”

Early life and studies

Matthieu Bessudo was born in Cannes and raised in Auribeau-sur-Siagne, a small town near Cannes, France. His mother is a primary school teacher in La Roquette-sur-Siagne and his father is a satellite designer. He quickly found interest in music, therefore studied drums for 8 years before choosing guitar as his favorite instrument.

in 2002, after his A-level in the Lycee Jules Ferry, in Cannes, he attended the renowned multimedia school Supinfocom in Arles. There he studied 3D animation during 4 years, and at the same time, started developing his own illustration style, at the time more colorful and less structured. During this period, he joined several famous boards of illustration over the internet such as Eatpoo and CafeSale, and started building his reputation. 
The nickname Mcbess was given to him during those years by a classmate, to distinguish him from the other Matthieu in the class.

In 2006, Mcbess graduated from Supinfocom with the short-movie "Sigg Jones" he directed with his two friends Douglas Lassance and Jonathan Vuillemin. The short-movie tells the story of a superstar and his agent. Initially called Bob Sapp as a reference to the Ultimate Fighter, a copyright issue forced the authors to come up with a new title. Douglas Lassance came with the name "Sigg Jones" a few days before their graduation, while brushing his teeth, he later consigned. Sigg Jones quickly became a reference in 3D animation because of its contemporary design and animation, and often caused debate for its featuring of Nike and Reebok sneakers.

Career beginnings

After graduation, the trio was signed individually as directors by The Mill, an Oscar-winning VFX company based in London.
At the same time, Mcbess started a new series of drawing, giving life to what he describes as the "New Mcbess".
With his illustration "My Desk", he defined the new codes of his future illustrations: A mix of influences including old cartoons such as Betty Boop and Merrie Melodies, often in an isometric view, himself being surrounded by surrealist elements, food, and cameos of his own instruments.

Exhibitions and publications

Since 2007, Mcbess has been published in several renowned magazines, such as Juxtapoz, Illustrated Ape, and Hi-Fructose.
He is very close to Rotopol Press in Kassel, Germany, who are exclusively printing his drawings, after organizing his first own exhibition in their shop in May 2008.
He's also been part of exhibitions in London, Hamburg, Tokyo, Los Angeles and Chicago.
Mcbess had a solo show at Issue Galerie in 2010, and again at Sergeant Paper Art Store in Paris in 2012.

Other projects and music

Illustration projects

Mcbess has founded the illustration crew called "Salle Polyvalente", featuring close friends of his.
He also participated to the blog "Naked Gladiators".

Mcbess is the illustrator of the brand Dudes factory.

Mcbess had done project with Nike, Deezer, Jack Daniels, Nissan and Transport for London.

Musical projects
Mcbess used to be the lead guitarist of a local band called Diztrait. They performed a gig at the MJC Ranguin in Cannes, on November 6, 2004.
Mcbess recently teamed-up with his friend Simon Landrein at The Mill, and created the music-video "Wood (Dirty Melody)" for his own band, the Dead Pirates. The clip quickly spread over the Internet, and has been featured in Wired and the popular 3D film blog Motionographer.

Mcbess plays a Gibson SG Standard and a Fender Stratocaster Hot Rod 62. He also possesses a Fender Jazz Bass Deluxe,
and recently acquired a Danelectro Baritone Guitar.

Gallery

References

External links
 Mcbess Website
 Salle Polyvalente Website
 The Dead Pirates Website
 Mcbess profil on Sergeant Paper Website
 Bernstein & Andriulli portfolio. Mcbess' UK & USA stills agents

French illustrators
1984 births
Living people